The Last Hour is a 1991 American action film directed by William Sachs, starring Michael Paré, Shannon Tweed and Bobby Di Cicco. It is also known under its alternative title Concrete War.

Plot
Susan is married to Eric, a rich stockbroker. One day, she is kidnapped by the mafia, who want to blackmail Eric into giving them 5 million dollar he stole from them earlier. Eric teams up with Susan's ex-husband Jeff, who is a cop, to liberate Susan together.

Production
William Sachs regarded the script as "a canvas" where he "could try all kinds of visual tricks and have fun". The film was released on video in many countries worldwide, starting in the US in October 1991, and in the UK in May 1992. It was particularly successful in Japan.

Cast
 Michael Paré as Jeff
 Shannon Tweed as Susan
 Bobby Di Cicco as Lombardi
 Robert Pucci as Eric
 George Kyle as Petralli 
 Danny Trejo as Spider 
 Robert Miano as Frankie
 Raye Hollitt as Adler

See also
 List of American films of 1991

References

External links

 The Last Hour: Trailer on youtube

1991 films
1990s action films
American independent films
1991 independent films
1990s English-language films
Films directed by William Sachs
1990s American films